The Bombardier Flexity Berlin is a tram type constructed for the Berlin tramway network. It was developed by Bombardier Transportation during the late 2000s and is based on the Bombardier Flexity family of 100% low-floor trams.

Overview 

The design is based upon earlier Adtranz Incentro models and like them, the Flexity Berlin is built from modules. The Berlin public transport operator Berliner Verkehrsbetriebe (BVG) ordered four different prototypes for testing. The variants are one each of 30-metre and 40-metre lengths in double-ended, or single-ended design. The shorter versions use five modules and the longer versions are built with seven modules.  Cab and door arrangement can be either bidirectional (two cab) or unidirectional (single cab) format depending upon the intended route. The first were rolled out during the InnoTrans 2008 railway trade fair. The appearance of the trams was especially designed for use in Berlin.

If the new Flexity tram tests are successful, then Bombardier's Hennigsdorf factory is scheduled to produce a further 206 units. The order would allow BVG to replace 452 high-floor ČKD Tatra KT4 trams. The Tatra trams being replaced are shorter and normally operated in pairs.

In 2009 BVG placed an order for an initial 99 trams for delivery from May 2011. The actual roll-in started on 5 September 2011. At the time of the initial order the BVG intended to order 33 more trams after 2017.

In June 2012 the BVG placed a second order for 39 trams – the last tram of the first contract arrived on 10 September 2012 and the first tram of the second contract arrived on 7 September 2012. The second contract included only long versions so that the amount of trams is enough to replace all of the old Tatra trams by 2017. The purchase is fully funded by the Bundesland Berlin at an amount of 439.1 million euros.

The nearby Strausberg Railway joined the delivery framework of the BVG Berlin Transport Company ordering 2 trams on 5 September 2011. The two short double-ended two-cab trams were delivered in February and March 2013 replacing its older trams (mostly Tatra KT8D5). The purchase is part of a 20-year contract with the county ensuring the financial basis. The contract for the two trams is at an amount of about 5.5 million euros.

The pilot batch was assembled in Bautzen which was later building the chassis for further assembly in Hennigsdorf near Berlin using some parts like motors from Bombardier facilities in Mannheim and Siegen. The factory in Hennigsdorf will deliver about 20 to 24 trains per year (with the last train from the second Berlin batch to be delivered during 2017).

See also 
 Strausberg Railway

References

See also

 The Bombardier Flexity family of low-floor trams with Flexity Classic and Flexity Swift used in other German cities
 Competitive low floor trams are the Siemens Avenio, AnsaldoBreda Sirio, Alstom Citadis and newcomer Crotram

Bombardier Transportation tram vehicles
Tram vehicles of Germany
Rail transport in Berlin
Light rail vehicles
Articulated passenger trains
600 V DC multiple units
750 V DC multiple units